This is a list of Native Americans with documented tribal ancestry or affiliation in the U.S. Congress.

All entries on this list are related to Native American tribes based in the contiguous United States. There are Native Hawaiians who have served in Congress, but they are not listed here because they are distinct from North American Natives. 

Only two Native Americans served in the 115th Congress: Tom Cole (serving since 2003) and Markwayne Mullin (served from 2013 until 2023), both of whom are Republican Representatives from Oklahoma.  On November 6, 2018, Democrats Sharice Davids of Kansas and Deb Haaland of New Mexico were elected to the U.S. House of Representatives, and the 116th Congress, which commenced on January 3, 2019, had four Native Americans. Davids and Haaland are the first two Native American women with documented tribal ancestry to serve in Congress. At the start of the 117th Congress on January 3, 2021, five Native Americans were serving in the House, the largest Native delegation in history: Cole, Mullin, Haaland and Davids were all reelected in 2020, with Republican Yvette Herrell of New Mexico elected for the first time in 2020. The number dropped back down to four on March 16, 2021 when Haaland resigned her House seat to become Secretary of the Interior. 

On August 16, 2022, Mary Peltola, a Yup'ik woman, was elected to the U.S. House of Representatives to represent Alaska, becoming the first person with documented Native Alaskan ancestry to serve in Congress. This returned the number of the Native delegation to five, with a partisan split of three Republicans and two Democrats. This also marked the first time that a Native American, Native Alaskan, and Native Hawaiian (Kai Kahele) simultaneously served in Congress.

Following the November 2022 elections, incumbents Cole (R-OK), Davids (D-KS) and Peltola (D-AK) all retained their seats, while Cherokee Republican Markwayne Mullin retired from the House and was elected to the Senate: Mullin became the first Native senator since the retirement of Ben Nighthorse Campbell (R-CO) in 2005, and his House seat was won by Choctaw Republican Josh Brecheen. In the same election, Yvette Herrell lost her seat due to redistricting, which drew litigation over alleged political gerrymandering; as such, Native Americans in the 118th Congress remain five, four in the House and one in the Senate. The partisan split is three Republicans and two Democrats. The states represented by Native members of Congress also dropped from four to three with Herrell's defeat in New Mexico.

Entries shaded in blue refer to current members of the U.S. Congress.

Senate 
 Denotes incumbent

Histograph
The histograph below sets forth the number of Native Americans who served in the United States Senate during the periods provided.

House of Representatives 
 Denotes incumbent

Cherokee delegate to the United States House of Representatives (not seated) 

 Political party

Histograph
The histograph below sets forth the number of Native Americans who served in the United States House during the periods provided.

References

 

Native
Congress